Brownell is a surname. Notable people with the surname include:
Abner C. Brownell (1813–1857), mayor of Cleveland, Ohio, United States
Baker Brownell, philosopher
Bill Brownell, American professional basketball player
Edwin Orion Brownell, Canadian neo-classical composer and concert pianist
Francis E. Brownell (1840–1894), Union Army soldier awarded the Medal of Honor for action during the American Civil War 
Francis H. Brownell (1867–1954), businessman, lawyer, and Washington state pioneer
Frederick Brownell, former South African state herald, designer of the South African flag
Herbert Brownell Jr. (1904–1996), United States Attorney General
Jim Brownell, politician
Joseph H. Brownell, American lumberman, farmer, politician
Kelly D. Brownell (born 1951), obesity researcher
Mia Brownell, American visual artist
Peter Brownell (born 1948), American politician
Raymond Brownell (1894–1974),  Royal Australian Air Force officer and World War I flying ace
Sonia Brownell, maiden name of Sonia Orwell (1918–1980), wife of George Orwell
Thomas Church Brownell (1779–1865), founder of Trinity College in Hartford, Connecticut, and Presiding Bishop of the Episcopal Church
William Crary Brownell (1851–1928), American literary and art critic
William E. Brownell, American scientist who conducts research at Baylor College of Medicine

See also
Brownell Car Company, street car manufacturer
Brownell, Indiana, United States
Brownell, Kansas, a city in Ness County, Kansas, United States
Perez v. Brownell, US Supreme Court citizenship case

Surnames of English origin